The Tree of Forgiveness is the eighteenth and final studio album by American country folk singer John Prine. The album was released on April 13, 2018. It is the last album released by Prine before his death on April 7, 2020.

Background
The album is Prine's first album since 2005's Fair & Square to consist of his own new songs. Most of the songs were co-written with other songwriters, including Pat McLaughlin, Dan Auerbach, Keith Sykes, and Phil Spector. The album features guest vocals from artists such as Jason Isbell, Amanda Shires, and Brandi Carlile. Isbell and Shires also played instruments in some of the tracks. The album was recorded at RCA Studio A in Nashville.

Critical reception

The Tree of Forgiveness has received positive reviews from professional music critics, with a Metacritic rating of 77 based on 13 critics, indicating "generally favorable reviews". Rolling Stone listed the album as the 22nd best album of 2018  and the 91st best album of the 2010s

Commercial performance
The album debuted at No. 5 on the Billboard 200, which is Prine's best-ever ranking on the chart. It also debuted at No. 2 on the Top Country Albums chart and Rock Albums, and No. 1 on Americana/Folk Albums, selling 53,000 copies (54,000 album-equivalent units) in the first week. It has sold 156,000 copies in the United States as of September 2019.

Track listing

Charts

Weekly charts

Year-end charts

References

2018 albums
John Prine albums
Oh Boy Records albums